Newton by Castle Acre is a village and civil parish in the Breckland district of the English county of Norfolk.

Geography
The parish shares boundaries with the adjacent parishes of Castle Acre, South Acre, Sporle with Palgrave, Little Dunham, Great Dunham and Lexham. The parish falls within the district of Breckland. Local government responsibilities are shared between the parish, district and county councils.

The millhouse
A mill house on the River Nar was built from a nearby ruined priory in 1797. During the 1990s Dick Joice, a noted Norfolk historian, owned the site and rebuilt the millhouse.

References

Villages in Norfolk
Civil parishes in Norfolk
Breckland District